The 1966 Nashville 400 was a NASCAR Grand National Series event that was held on July 30, 1966, at Nashville Speedway in Nashville, Tennessee.

Out of Henley Gray's five career finishes in the top five and 60 finishes in the top ten, two of them came at Nashville Speedway.

Background
Nashville Speedway was converted to a half-mile paved oval in 1957, when it began to be a NASCAR series track.

Race report
It took two hours and forty-seven minutes to complete 400 laps on a paved track spanning . Out of all of Richard Petty's 200 victories in Grand National/Winston Cup competition, arguably none were as dominant as this one. Richard Petty won the pole and led all 400 laps of the Nashville 400. While Petty had Jim Paschal to contend with right to the end during the 1964 NASCAR Grand National Series season, this event saw King Richard lap the field five times over. Buck Baker's finish in his Oldsmobile would be considered great since he qualified outside of the top ten. 15,161 spectators watched this race with four cautions being handed out by NASCAR for 41 laps.

The most notable crew chiefs that were involved in the event were Herman Beam, Bob Cooper, Clair Jackson, Frankie Scott, Dale Inman and Bud Hartje.

The racing grid was made up of 27 Americans and one Canadian (Don Biederman who finished the race in 19th place). Darel Dieringer received the last place finish for crashing his car at the beginning of the race. Jack Lawrence would crash his vehicle on lap 2 while Blackie Watt's vehicle suffered from a problematic radiator on lap 21. Doug Cooper fell out with engine failure on lap 49. J.D. McDuffie managed to overheat his vehicle on lap 54. Paul Lewis blew his vehicle's engine on lap 100 while Roy Tyner's vehicle had an oil leak on lap 141. J.T. Putney's engine would stop working altogether on lap 171. An oil leak would relegate Don Biederman to the sidelines on lap 214. Wayne Smith's engine stopped working on lap 220 while a loose frame took Elmo Langley out of the race on lap 250.

Driveshaft problems took Friday Hassler out of the race on lap 256. A problem with the vehicle's differential took Buddy Arrington out of the race on lap 262. An oil leak forced Joel Davis out of the race on lap 268 while a troublesome differential on G.C. Spencer's vehicle took him out of the race on lap 287. A faulty engine took Stick Elliott out of the race on lap 308. Meanwhile, the throttle on James Hylton's vehicle stopped working; causing Hylton to exit the race prematurely on lap 352.

Coo Coo Marlin was considered to be popular with the local racing supporters on the weekends when the NASCAR toured Nashville. He was considered the odds-on favorite to win the race even when he drove a one-year-old vehicle to the track. Unfortunately, he was only the 27th best driver to compete at Nashville Fairgrounds; with an average start of 11th place and an average finish of 13th place.

Marty Robbins participated in this race and was announced as "Columbia Records' recording star". He finished 25th due to an oil leak problem on lap 48. Marty Robbins' Cup debut marked the only time he ran in the series on a short track. The county singer fittingly hit the track here at Nashville but all the rest of his Cup starts would be on superspeedway ovals.

Qualifying

Top 10 finishers

References

Nashville 400
Nashville 400
NASCAR races at Fairgrounds Speedway